Sjur Jarle Hauge (born 18 December 1971) is a Norwegian football coach and former player.

He started his career in SK Haugar; and later went to Bryne. He joined FK Haugesund in 1995, and enjoyed a spell in the Norwegian Premier League in the seasons 1997 and 1998. He left ahead of the 2000 season to become player-coach at Torvastad IL. In 2007, he was hired in the same position at Djerv 1919.

References

1971 births
Living people
People from Haugesund
Norwegian footballers
Association football midfielders
SK Haugar players
Bryne FK players
FK Haugesund players
SK Djerv 1919 players
Norwegian football managers
Sportspeople from Rogaland